Meierhenrich is a surname. Notable people with the surname include:

Uwe Meierhenrich (born 1967), German chemist
Jens Meierhenrich, scholar of law and international relations
Nova Meierhenrich (born 1973), German television presenter and actress

See also
Meierhenry

German-language surnames